This is a list of events taking place in 2012 related to Croatian television.

Events

Debuts (including scheduled)

HRT

Nova TV

RTL Televizija

Television shows

1950s

1960s

1970s

1980s

1990s

2000s

2010s

Ending this year

Deaths

See also
2012 in Croatia

References

 
Television